Boghassa (var. Boughessa) is a Saharan-Malian village and commune in the Cercle of Abeïbara in the Kidal Region of north-eastern Mali near the border with Algeria. In the 2009 census the commune had a population of 3,401.

References

External links
.

Communes of Kidal Region